Dhaka Post is a Bengali and English language online news media in Bangladesh. Launched on 16 February 2021, As of December 2021, Alexa ranked the website 3,479 worldwide and sixth in Bangladesh which is the second among the News websites and first position Internet-based newspaper in Bangladesh.

History
Dhaka post is owned by The Bijoy Bangla Media Limited (BBML) is a sister concern of the US Bangla Group of Companies. It officially launched on 16 February 2021 with the slogan `Treaty with the truth’. Mohiuddin Sarker is editor. He is former Acting Editor of Jagonews24.com. The portal has started the multimedia journalism and podcast at starting time. English daily Dhaka Tribune published news To Dhaka post source.

In 2021, Dhaka Post achieved the DRU Best reporting award for reporting on the series titled 'Dhaka University in its centenary'.

5 farmers in Bangladesh go to jail after falling into the 'trap of motivation' of fraudsters. On July 12, 2021, Dhaka Post's investigative report '5 farmers were hanged for talking about incentives' was discussed all over the country. The text and visual report of the media reveals how a gang sent 5 farmers to jail in a fake loan default case through bank fraud.

On 4 October 2021, that investigative report was later presented by the lawyers in the court and on 6 October the five farmers were released on bail in the Bangladesh High Court.

See also
 BBC Bangla
 Bangla Tribune

References

External links 
  (BN)
  (EN)

2021 establishments in Bangladesh
Newspapers published in Dhaka
Bangladeshi news websites